The Metropolitan Commons Act 1866 (29 & 30 Vict c 122) is an Act of the Parliament of the United Kingdom that allowed local authorities within the area of the Metropolitan Police District around London, England to use income from rates to protect and maintain common lands in their areas. It was amended by the Metropolitan Commons Amendment Act 1869.

It is one of the Metropolitan Commons Acts 1866 to 1878.

References
Halsbury's Statutes of England. (The Complete Statutes of England). Butterworth & Co (Publishers) Ltd. London. 1929. Volume 2. Page 567. Google Books.
The Statutes of Practical Utility. Arranged in Alphabetical and Chronological Order with Notes and Indexes. Being the Fifth Edition of "Chitty's Statutes". Sweet and Maxwell. Stevens and Sons. London. 1894. Volume 5. Pages 206 to 212.
Paterson (ed). The Practical Statutes of the Session 1866. Horace Cox. London. 1866. Pages 317 to 328.
A Collection of the Public General Statutes passed in the Twenty-ninth and Thirtieth Years of the Reign of Her Majesty Queen Victoria. Printed by George Edward Eyre and William Spottiswoode, Printers to the Queen's most Excellent Majesty. 1866. Pages 607 to 612.
Chambers, George F. A Digest of the Law Relating to Commons, and Open Spaces, Including Public Parks, and Recreation Grounds. Stevens and Sons. Shaw and Sons. London. 1877. Pages 34 to 39 and 59.
Mews, John. "Metropolitan Commons". A Digest of the Reported Decisions of the Courts of Common Law, Bankruptcy, Probate, Admiralty, and Divorce: Together with a Selection from Those of the Court of Chancery and Irish Courts, from 1756 to 1883 Inclusive. H Sweet. Stevens and Sons. W Maxwell and Son. London. 1884. Volume 2. 297 and 298

External links
Metropolitan Commons Act 1866 (original text)

United Kingdom Acts of Parliament 1866
1866 in London
Acts of the Parliament of the United Kingdom concerning London